Jack Porter is a sociologist.

Jack Porter may also refer to:

Jack Porter, a character in Revenge
Jack Porter, a character in Watch Over Me
Jack Porter (political activist) (1896-1986), Texas businessman and political activist

See also
John Porter (disambiguation)